Joseph B. Allen is an American politician. He served as a Democratic member for the 120th district of the Florida House of Representatives.

Allen was elected for the 120th district of the Florida House of Representatives in 1976, serving until 1986.

References 

Living people
Place of birth missing (living people)
Year of birth missing (living people)
Democratic Party members of the Florida House of Representatives
20th-century American politicians